Gabriel Vargas Santos Airport  is an airport serving Tame, in the Arauca Department of Colombia. The runway is just west of the town.

The Tame VOR-DME (Ident: TME) and Tame non-directional beacon (Ident: TME) are located on the field.

Airlines and destinations

See also

Transport in Colombia
List of airports in Colombia

References

External links
OpenStreetMap - Tame
OurAirports - Tame
FallingRain - Tame Airport

Airports in Colombia
Buildings and structures in Arauca Department